Megatibicen figuratus, commonly called the fall southeastern dusk-singing cicada, is a species of annual cicada in the genus Megatibicen. Prior to its reclassification to the genus Megatibicen, M. figuratus was included in the genus Neotibicen.

References

Hemiptera of North America
Cryptotympanini